TacOps is a turn-based wargame originally released in 1994. The game, developed by Major I.L. Holdridge, USMC (ret), details modern, hypothetical combat between U.S. troops versus the OPFOR who are armed with various equipment from across the globe. Later additions added units for the Canadian, Australian and New Zealand armies, and the US Marines.

The game is noted for its encyclopedic array of modern arms and units, and the detailing of the combat.

Gameplay
Instead of typical hex or square based movement, the forces move around without a grid. Players take turns giving orders and then watching the battles unfold on the map. Also, players cannot directly control where their troops fire, but rather control parameters such as fire zones, and range of engagement. The game is considered very realistic, and includes a database with information and photos for all of the units in the game.

Game play is divided into two phases.  In the order phase time does not pass in the game and orders can be entered.  During a combat phase these orders are executed and the player can only watch the results as 60 seconds of game time passes.

Order phase
During the order phase of a turn, when a player clicks on a unit its Order Box comes up. The player can order where the unit moves and, among other options, where it faces, whether it is exposed, and fire sector orders (with varying priorities).

Combat phase
After a player is satisfied with the orders they have given, they may move on to the combat phase. A combat phase represents 60 seconds, and is typically divided into four 15-second segments in which units fire and move.

Reception
TacOps was a runner-up for Computer Game Entertainments 1996 "Best War Game" prize, which ultimately went to Tigers on the Prowl 2. The editors summarized TacOps as "excellent".

References

External links 
 Battlefront.com — Original publisher

1994 video games
Computer wargames
Classic Mac OS games
Video games developed in the United States
Windows games